Zulu Love Letter is a 2004 film.

Synopsis 
Thandeka, a young Black journalist, lives in fear of Johannesburg's past. She's so troubled that she can't work, and her relationship with her 13-year-old deaf daughter Mangi goes from bad to worse. One day Me'Tau, an elderly woman, arrives at the newspaper's office. Ten years earlier, Thandeka witnessed the murder of the woman's daughter Dinéo by the secret police. Me'Tau wants Thandeka to find the murderers and Dinéo's body so that the girl can be buried in accordance with tradition. What Me'Tau couldn't know is that Thandeka has already paid for her knowledge, for having dared stand up to the apartheid system run by the whites. Meanwhile, Mangi secretly prepares a Zulu love letter: four embroidered images representing solitude, loss, hope, and love, as a final gesture towards her mother so that she won't give up the fight.

Awards 
 Cartago 2004
 Mons 2005
 FESPACO 2005
 Cape Town World Cinema 2005
 Angers 2005

References

External links 
 
 African Zulu Love Letters | Gosouvenirsafrica

2004 films
French drama films
German drama films
South African drama films
2000s French films
2000s German films